The Ministry of Industries (abbreviated as MoInd) is primarily responsible for developing new policies and strategies for promotion, expansion and sustainable development of Industrial sector of Bangladesh. The minister as of January 2019 was Nurul Majid Mahmud Humayun.

Corporations
 Bangladesh Chemical Industries Corporation (BCIC)
 Bangladesh Sugar and Food Industries Corporation (BFSIC)
 Bangladesh Steel and Engineering Corporation (BSEC)
 Bangladesh Small and Cottage Industry Corporation (BSCIC)

Departments
 Bangladesh Standards and Testing Institution (BSTI)
 Bangladesh Industrial and Technical Assistance Center (BITAC)
 Bangladesh Institute of Management (BIM)
 Department of Patents, Designs and Trademarks (DPDT)
 National Productivity Organization (NPO)
 Office of The Chief Inspector of Boilers

Board
 Bangladesh Accreditation Board (BAB)

Foundation
 Small and Medium Enterprise Foundation (SMEF)
 Small, Micro and Cottage Industry Foundation (SMCIF)

References

External links 
 

 
Education
Industry in Bangladesh
Industry ministries